Just As I Am is the debut studio album of American soul musician Bill Withers, released in 1971 on Sussex Records. The album features the hit single "Ain't No Sunshine", which was ranked at number 280 on Rolling Stone magazine's list of the 500 Greatest Songs of All Time. The album is also known for featuring the single "Grandma's Hands," which reached number 18 on the Best Selling Soul Singles chart and 42 on the Billboard Hot 100. Booker T. Jones produced, arranged, and played keyboards and guitar on Just As I Am. The album was later reissued as a dual disc with the DVD side featuring all the tracks in 5.1 Surround Sound.

In 2020, Rolling Stone ranked the album at number 304 in their list of the 500 Greatest Albums of All Time.

Critical reception 
Reviewing in Christgau's Record Guide: Rock Albums of the Seventies (1981), Robert Christgau wrote:

Track listing

Chart history

Personnel
 Bill Withers – guitar, vocals
 Stephen Stills – guitar
 Booker T. Jones – guitar, keyboards, arrangements 
 Donald Dunn – bass guitar
 Chris Ethridge – bass guitar
 Jim Keltner – drums
 Al Jackson Jr. – drums
 Bobbye Hall – percussion

Production
 Booker T. Jones – producer 
 Bill Halverson – engineer
 Bill Lazerus – engineer
 Jim Golden – remixing
 Sam Feldman – mastering at Bell Sound Studios (New York City, New York).
 Norbert Jobst – design, photography 
 Bill Withers – sleeve notes

References

External links

1971 debut albums
Bill Withers albums
Albums produced by Booker T. Jones
Sussex Records albums
Albums recorded at Sunset Sound Recorders
Albums recorded at Wally Heider Studios